Lent Township is a township in Chisago County, Minnesota, United States.  The population was 3,091 as of the 2010 census, up from 1,992 in 2000.

History
Lent Township was organized in 1872, and named by Seth Kunza, a pioneer settler.

Geography
Lent Township is located in western Chisago County and is bordered by Isanti and Anoka counties to the west, the cities of Stacy, Wyoming, and Chisago City to the south, Chisago Lake Township to the east, and the city of North Branch to the north.

Interstate 35 crosses the western side of the township, leading north to North Branch and south to Stacy.  County 17 exit provides access within the township, while County 19 exit in Stacy provides access to the southern part of the township.

Demographics

As of the census of 2000, there were 1,992 people, 657 households, and 559 families residing in the township. There were 667 housing units at an average density of 20.1/sq mi (7.7/km2). The racial makeup of the township was 97.99% White, 0.10% African American, 0.20% Native American, 0.50% Asian, 0.05% Pacific Islander, 0.25% from other races, and 0.90% from two or more races. Hispanic or Latino of any race were 1.31% of the population.

There were 657 households, out of which 46.9% had children under the age of 18 living with them, 77.5% were married couples living together, 4.4% had a female householder with no husband present, and 14.8% were non-families. 10.7% of all households were made up of individuals, and 2.0% had someone living alone who was 65 years of age or older.  The average household size was 3.03 and the average family size was 3.26.

In the township the population was spread out, with 30.5% under the age of 18, 6.9% from 18 to 24, 36.5% from 25 to 44, 21.7% from 45 to 64, and 4.4% who were 65 years of age or older.  The median age was 34 years. For every 100 females, there were 108.6 males.  For every 100 females age 18 and over, there were 109.2 males.

The median income for a household in the township was $61,163, and the median income for a family was $62,574. Males had a median income of $39,310 versus $31,098 for females. The per capita income for the township was $22,089.  About 0.7% of families and 1.2% of the population were below the poverty line, including 1.6% of those under age 18 and none of those age 65 or over.

References

External links
Lent Township official website

Townships in Chisago County, Minnesota
Townships in Minnesota